Young Women's Leadership Academy (YWLA) may refer to these public all girls' schools in Texas:
 Young Women's Leadership Academy (Fort Worth, Texas), Fort Worth
 Young Women's Leadership Academy at Arnold, Grand Prairie
 Young Women's Leadership Academy (San Antonio, Texas), San Antonio

See also
 Young Women's Leadership School (disambiguation)